Thomas C. Barton (born 1831 in Cleveland, Ohio) was an American seaman who served in the Union Navy during the American Civil War. Barton enlisted in the Navy in June 1861, and resigned in April 1864.

While serving aboard the  during the Joint Expedition Against Franklin, Barton extinguished an ignited howitzer shell which had fallen onto the deck.  For this action, Barton was promoted to acting master's mate and awarded the Medal of Honor on 3 April 1863; the citation for the latter read:On board the U.S.S. Hunchback in the attack on Franklin, Va., 3 October 1862. When an ignited shell, with cartridge attached, fell out of the howitzer upon the deck, S/man Barton promptly seized a pail of water and threw it upon the missile, thereby preventing it from exploding.

See also

List of Medal of Honor recipients

References

1831 births
United States Navy Medal of Honor recipients
Military personnel from Cleveland
People of Ohio in the American Civil War
Union Navy sailors
Year of death unknown
American Civil War recipients of the Medal of Honor